Musaceae is a family of flowering plants composed of three genera with about 91 known species, placed in the order Zingiberales. The family is native to the tropics of Africa and Asia. The plants have a large herbaceous growth habit with leaves with overlapping basal sheaths that form a pseudostem making some members appear to be woody trees. In most treatments, the family has three genera, Musa, Musella and Ensete. Cultivated bananas are commercially important members of the family, and many others are grown as ornamental plants.

Taxonomy

The family has been practically universally recognized by taxonomists, although with differing circumscriptions. Older circumscriptions of the family commonly included the genera now included in Heliconiaceae and Strelitziaceae.

The APG III system, of 2009 (unchanged from the APG system, 1998), assigns Musaceae to the order Zingiberales in the clade commelinids in the monocots.

Genera

As currently circumscribed the family includes three genera. All genera and species are native to the Old World tropics. The largest and most economically important genus in the family is Musa, famous for the banana and plantain. The genus Musa was formally established in the first edition of Linnaeus' Species Plantarum in 1753 — the publication that marks the start of the present formal botanical nomenclature. At the time he wrote Species Plantarum, Linnaeus had first hand knowledge of only one type of banana, which he personally had the opportunity of seeing growing under glass in the garden of Mr. George Clifford near Haarlem in the Netherlands.

Before 1753, the genus had already been described by the pre-Linnaean botanist Georg Eberhard Rumphius and Linnaeus himself had described the banana he had seen as Musa cliffortiana in 1736 (this might be described as a "pre-Linnaean" Linnaean name). The 1753 name Musa paradisiaca L. for plantains and Musa sapientum L. for dessert bananas are now known to refer to hybrids, rather than natural species. It is known today that most cultivated seedless bananas are hybrids or polyploids of two wild banana species - Musa acuminata and Musa balbisiana. Linnaeus' Musa sapientum is now identified to be the hybrid Latundan cultivar (M. × paradisiaca AAB Group 'Silk'), while his Musa paradisiaca are now known to be hybrids belonging generally to the AAB and ABB banana cultivar groups. Hybridization and polyploidy was the cause of much confusion in the taxonomy of the genus Musa that was not resolved until the 1940s and 1950s.

In this clearing up of the taxonomy, Ernest Entwistle Cheesman in 1947 revived the genus name Ensete which had been published in 1862, by Horaninow, but had not been accepted.

Musa section Musella Franch. was raised to the rank of genus by H.W. Li in 1978 for the Chinese species Musella lasiocarpa, which was originally described in Musa in 1889 and transferred to Ensete by Cheesman in 1948. The species combines characters like the swollen stems of Ensete with the clonal habit of Musa.

References

Bibliography

External links
 Preliminary analysis of the literature on the distribution of wild Musa species
 Musaceae at the Angiosperm Phylogeny Website
 Musaceae in the Flora of China
 Musaceae  in L. Watson and M.J. Dallwitz (1992 onwards). The families of flowering plants : descriptions, illustrations, identification, information retrieval. Version: 27 April 2006. http://delta-intkey.com .
 Monocot families (USDA)
 NCBI Taxonomy Browser
 links at CSDL
 The Musaceae - an annotated list of the species 

 
Commelinid families